Marcus Claudius Tacitus (died June 276) was Roman emperor from 275 to 276. During his short reign he campaigned against the Goths and the Heruli, for which he received the title Gothicus Maximus.

Early life

His early life is largely unknown. An origin story which claimed Tacitus to be the heir of an old Umbrian family and one of the wealthiest men of the empire with a total wealth of 280 million sestertii circulated after his coronation. His faction distributed copies of the historian Publius Cornelius Tacitus' work, which was barely read at the time, perhaps contributing to its partial survival. Modern historiography rejects his alleged descent from the historian as a fabrication. It is more likely that he emerged from the Illyrian military, which made him a representative of the army in imperial politics.

In the course of his long life he held various civil offices, including the consulship twice, once under Valerian and again in 273, earning universal respect.

Emperor
After the assassination of Aurelian, the army, apparently showing remorse towards its role in the death of the beloved emperor, relinquished the right of choosing his successor to the Senate. After a few weeks, the throne was offered to the aged Princeps Senatus, Tacitus. 

According to the Historia Augusta, Tacitus, after ascertaining the sincerity of the Senate's regard for him, accepted their nomination on 25 September 275, and the choice was cordially ratified by the army. If true, Tacitus would have been the last emperor elected by the Senate. However, it's possible that much of this narrative is fictitious, as Zosimus and Zonaras report that Tacitus was actually proclaimed by the army without any intervention of the Senate. His proclamation as emperor should have happened in late November or early December.

In older historiography, it was generally accepted that Aurelian's wife, Ulpia Severina, ruled in her own right before the election of Tacitus which could indicate an interregnum which lasted as long as six months. Contemporary bibliography considers that no interregnum may have existed between Aurelian's death and the coronation of the new Emperor. Tacitus had been living in Campania before his election, and returned only reluctantly to the assembly of the Senate in Rome, where he was elected. He immediately asked the Senators to deify Aurelian, before arresting and executing Aurelian's murderers. In ancient sources, he was described as very old at that time, but in reality he was possibly in his fifties.

Amongst the highest concerns of the new reign was the restoration of the ancient Senatorial powers. He granted substantial prerogatives to the Senate, securing to them by law the appointment of the emperor, of the consuls, and the provincial governors, as well as supreme right of appeal from every court in the empire in its judicial function, and the direction of certain branches of the revenue in its long-abeyant administrative capacity. Probus respected these changes, but after the reforms of Diocletian in the succeeding decades not a vestige would be left of them.

Fighting barbarians
Next he moved against the barbarian mercenaries that had been gathered by Aurelian to supplement Roman forces for his Eastern campaign.  These mercenaries had plundered several towns in the Eastern Roman provinces after Aurelian had been murdered and the campaign cancelled. His half-brother, the Praetorian Prefect Florian, and Tacitus himself won a victory against these tribes, among which were the Heruli, gaining the emperor the title Gothicus Maximus.

Death
On his way back to the west to deal with a Frankish and Alamannic invasion of Gaul, according to Aurelius Victor, Eutropius and the Historia Augusta, Tacitus died of fever at Tyana in Cappadocia around June 276, after a rule of just over 6 months. In a contrary account, Zosimus claims he was assassinated, after appointing one of his relatives to an important command in Syria.

References

Sources

Ancient sources
 Historia Augusta, Vita Taciti, English translation
 Eutropius, Breviarium ab urbe condita, ix. 16, English translation
 Aurelius Victor, "Epitome de Caesaribus", English translation
 Zosimus, "Historia Nova", English translation
 Joannes Zonaras, Compendium of History extract: Zonaras: Alexander Severus to Diocletian: 222–284

Secondary sources
  McMahon, Robin, "Tacitus (275–276 A.D)", De Imperatoribus Romanis
 

 Southern, Pat. The Roman Empire from Severus to Constantine, Routledge, 2001
Gibbon. Edward Decline & Fall of the Roman Empire (1888)

Further reading 

Constantine P. Cavafy, The Complete Poems, Harcourt, Brace & World (1961), p. 201
Alan Dugan, Poems 2, Yale University Press (1963), p. 33

200 births
276 deaths
Year of birth uncertain
3rd-century Roman emperors
3rd-century murdered monarchs
Illyrian people
Imperial Roman consuls
Crisis of the Third Century
Claudii
Murdered Roman emperors
Gothicus Maximus